Contact or Kontakt is a 1978 Soviet animated short film.

Plot
A painter leaves the town and walks around countryside. While he is resting on the grass, humming the melody of Speak Softly Love, a large spaceship lands near him. An alien exits the spaceship, photographs the environment and tries to contact the painter by changing his appearance to resemble nearby animals and objects and by touching him. The painter is frightened and tries to run away, but becomes tired, falls from a cliff and lies on the ground, imagining that the alien is going to lock him in a cage and torture him. The alien approaches the painter and tries to hum the same melody that the painter hummed earlier, but makes some mistakes. The painter understands that the alien is friendly, teaches him the correct melody, and they walk away together hand in hand.

The film has no dialogue in any language. All communication is made using music, gestures and gazes; the alien also tries to communicate by shapeshifting. Director Vladimir Tarasov explored this theme of universal communication in his other films; he considered animation "the Esperanto of all mankind".

Influence and recognition
Even though The Godfather films were not distributed in the Soviet Union, the theme music was familiar to Soviet people thanks to this short film.

Contact received awards at the following festivals:
 XVIII Festival of science fiction films in Trieste, 1979
 VIII Festival of short and documentary films in Lille, 1979

References

Bibliography

External links
 
 
 Information about the film Contact on animator.ru 
 
 
 

1978 films
1970s science fiction films
Russian and Soviet animated science fiction films
Films by Vladimir Tarasov
Soyuzmultfilm
Russian animated short films